Tomáš Kučera (born 19 June 1984) is a Slovak football player, who played in Slovakia and the Czech Republic as a goalkeeper.

Career statistics

References

External links
 
 Guardian Football

1984 births
Living people
Slovak footballers
Association football goalkeepers
Czech First League players
FK Dukla Prague players
MFK Karviná players